or  (lit. Reindeer Lake) is a lake in the municipality of Hamarøy in Nordland county, Norway.

See also
List of lakes in Norway

References

Hamarøy
Lakes of Nordland